King Oscar Glacier is a large glacier in the Avannaata Municipality, on the northwestern coast of Greenland.

Geography
The King Oscar Glacier is one of several glaciers that drain the north-western part of the Greenland Ice Sheet into Melville Bay. It flows roughly southwestwards between the Peary Glacier to the northwest and the Nordenskiold Glacier to the southeast.

Status
As part of a comprehensive survey of Greenland's glaciers that was published in 2006, scientists documented that the mass balance—the sum of gains through snow accumulation and losses through iceberg calving and melting—of Kong Oscar and Greenland's other north-western glaciers was strongly negative between 1996 and 2005: they lost more ice than they gained. The pattern was similar to the ice sheet as a whole, which has been losing ice mass at an accelerating pace in the past decade.

See also
List of glaciers in Greenland

References

Glaciers of Greenland

ceb:Kong Oscar Gletscher
sv:Kong Oscar Gletscher